Roza Abdulbasirovna Eldarova (21 December 1923 – 4 July 2021) was a Soviet and Russian journalist of Kumyk ethnicity, writer, and politician who was the first woman to hold the highest political office in Dagestan. She was elected chairwoman of the Presidium of the Supreme Soviet of the Dagestan Autonomous Soviet Socialist Republic (DASSR) in March 1962.

Simultaneously elected to the Supreme Soviet of the RSFSR as a deputy for the DASSR, she became a member of the Presidium of the RSFSR Supreme Soviet in April 1962.

Eldarova retired from active involvement in politics in 1989 but continued to write. She published a memoir in 2008. Eldarova died on 4 July 2021 at the age of 97.

Honours
 Order of Lenin
 Order of the October Revolution
 Twice Orders of the Red Banner of Labour
 Order of Friendship of Peoples
 Medal "For Labour Valour"

References

External links
 Women leaders in the former Soviet Union

1923 births
2021 deaths
People from Buynaksky District
Kumyks
Communist Party of the Soviet Union members
Recipients of the Order of Friendship of Peoples
Recipients of the Order of Lenin
Russian women journalists
Russian memoirists
Russian non-fiction writers
Soviet journalists
Soviet non-fiction writers
Soviet women in politics
20th-century Russian women politicians
Soviet women writers
Soviet writers
Women memoirists
20th-century Russian women writers
Communist women writers